Alexander G. Argyropoulos (1883–1962) was born in London and was the son of the Greek ambassador to the United Kingdom. He trained as an agricultural engineer. In his spare time he was a noted philatelist.
From 1952 to 1956 he was Greek Ambassador to Italy.

Philately
Argyropoulos was largely responsible for the Greek section of the Kohl Briefmarken-Handbuch. He was joint-editor of Philotelia from 1953 and an early member of the Hellenic Philotelic Society as well as a member of the Royal Philatelic Society London. He was added to the Roll of Distinguished Philatelists in 1954. He won the Grand Prix International for most outstanding exhibit in the Class of Honour at the STOCKHOLMIA 55 stamp exhibition for his display of the first Greek stamps.

References

Signatories to the Roll of Distinguished Philatelists
1883 births
1962 deaths
Greek philatelists
Philately of Greece
Agricultural engineers
People from London
Greek expatriates in the United Kingdom
Greek expatriates in Italy